The 22983/22984 Indore–Kota Intercity Express is a daily intercity superfast express train which runs between  of Madhya Pradesh and  of Rajasthan.

Coach composition

The train consists of 15 coaches :

 1 AC Chair Car
 4 2nd Seating
 8 General Unreserved
 2 Seating cum Luggage Rake

Service

22983/ Kota–Indore Intercity Express has an average speed of 56 km/hr and covers 433 km in 7 hrs 45 mins.

The 22984/ Indore–Kota Intercity Express has an average speed of 55 km/hr and covers 433 km in 7 hrs 52 mins.

Route and halts

The important halts of the train are:

Schedule

Direction reversal

Train reverses its direction  at:

Traction

Both trains are hauled by a Diesel Loco Shed, Ratlam-based WDM-3A or WDM-3D diesel locomotive.

References

Rail transport in Madhya Pradesh
Transport in Kota, Rajasthan
Transport in Indore
Rail transport in Rajasthan
Railway services introduced in 2011
Express trains in India